is a Japanese actress.  In addition to her many live-action film and television roles, she had a prominent voice role as Kamiya Kaoru in the Rurouni Kenshin anime series, and as Chun-Li in Street Fighter II The Movie.

Filmography

Live-action film
  (1988)
   (1988)
  (1988)
 Nozomi Witches (live-action, 1990)
 Bloom in the Moonlight (1993)
  (1994) – Chie Minami
  (1995)
  (Heisei version, 1996) – Yuki
  (1997, directed by Kan Mukai) – Mirai Ito
  (1998) – Kuniko
  (2000, directed by Ikuo Sekimoto) – Xiao Chun
 Merdeka 17805 (2001) – Sanae Miyata
  (2004) – Koma Inoue
  (2007) – Toshiko Suzuki
  (2007) – Chiyo Awaji

Live-action television
 1980s
  (1987) - cast member
  (1988) - cast member
  (1989)
  (1989) - cast member
  (1989)
  (1989) – Episode series: Sarashina Nikki
 1990s
  (1990)
  (1990)
 Anne of Green Gables (CX golden movie theater, 1990) – Anne (dub)
  (1991)
  (1991)
  (1991)
  (1991) – Akane Murakami
 Anne of Green Gables (sequel, CX golden movie theater, 1991) – Anne (dub)
  (1991) – Hazuki Sasayama
  (1992) – Episode: "
  (1992)
  (1993) – Aki Yaguchi (Hiroki Matsukata's character's daughter)
  (1993)
  (1993)
  (1994) – Rumi Iwasaki
  (1995)
  (1995)
  (1995)
  (1995)
  (1995)
  (1996)
  (1996)
  (1996) – Aoi Kuroda
  (1996) – Maiko Tsuda – TBS series, Part 6:  
  (1996) – Yuka Asakura
  series (1997-2005) – Saeko Mimura – 12 episodes
  (1997) – Part 9 
  (1998) – Kazu Kitamura
  (1998) – Part 4: 
  (1998) – CX series Part 6 
  (1999) – Yoshi Tomomi
  (1999)
  (1999)
  (1999) – Kaoru Kotobuki
 2000s
  (2000)
  (2000) – Season 13, Episode 3 
  (2000) – Masako Tezuka
  (2000–present) – Kazumi Kariya - 20 episodes
  (2001)
  (2001) – Okane Fukui – Episode 4 
  (2002) – Machiko Mimura – Episode 3 
  (2002) – Hikaru Saegusa
  (2003)
  (2003)
  (2003) – Season 1, Episode 2
  (2003, 2011) – Episode 8
  (2004) – Noriko Kodama – Episode 
  (2004)
  (2004) – Episodes 74-77
  (CX, 2005) – Mitsuhiko Asami series 20th commemorabtion program
  (2005) – Episode 4
  (2005)
  (2005) – Episode 34 
  (2005)
  (2005) - Episode 3
  (2006)
  (2006) - Episode 2
  (2006)
  (2007) – Asami Moriyama
  (2008) - Rieko Tachibana - Episode 1
  - Kazumi Tsukbaki (2009–11) - 3 episodes
 2010s
  (2010) – Aki Oyama

Anime
 Rurouni Kenshin – Kamiya Kaoru

Dubbing
 ER – Debbie (Mary McCormack)

Discography

References

 Book references

External links
  
  
 
 
 Miki Fujitani at TV Drama Database 

1973 births
Living people
People from Nagoya
Japanese child actresses
Japanese film actresses
Japanese idols
Japanese television actresses
Japanese voice actresses
20th-century Japanese actresses
21st-century Japanese actresses